The 1989 Big West Conference men's basketball tournament was held March 8–11 at the Long Beach Arena in Long Beach, California. This was the first tournament after the Big West Conference renamed itself from the Pacific Coast Athletic Association (PCAA) in July 1988.

Top-seeded  defeated  in the final, 68–62, and captured their fifth PCAA/Big West championship. This was the Runnin' Rebels' fifth title in seven seasons.

The Rebels, in turn, received an automatic bid to the 1989 NCAA tournament, where they would advance to the Elite Eight.

Format
There were no changes to the tournament format from 1988. All ten conference members participated in the field, with teams seeded in the bracket based on regular season conference records.

The top six seeds were given a bye into the quarterfinal round while the four lowest-seeded teams were placed into an initial preliminary round.

Bracket

References

Big West Conference men's basketball tournament
Tournament
Big West Conference men's basketball tournament
Big West Conference men's basketball tournament